David Geddes may refer to:

 David Geddes (cinematographer) (David A. Geddes, born 1949), Canadian cinematographer
 David Geddes (musician) (David Cole Idema, born 1950), American musician and singer

See also
 David Geddis (born 1958), English footballer and football coach